The 1942 Colgate Red Raiders football team was an American football team that represented Colgate University as an independent during the 1942 college football season. In its 14th season under head coach Andrew Kerr, the team compiled a 6–2–1 record and outscored opponents by a total of 172 to 104. Warren Anderson was the team captain. The team played its home games at Colgate Athletic Field in Hamilton, New York.

Schedule

References

Colgate
Colgate Raiders football seasons
Colgate Red Raiders football